Naziha is a female name, common in the Middle East and North Africa. Notable people with the name include:

 Naziha Syed Ali, Pakistani journalist
 Naziha Arebi, Libyan-British director and producer
 Naziha al-Dulaimi (1923–2007), Iraqi feminist
 Naziha Mestaoui, Belgian artist
 Naziha Réjiba, Tunisian journalist
 Naziha Salim (1927–2008), Iraqi artist, educator, and author

Arabic feminine given names